Bankya Peak is the peak rising to 877 m in Korten Ridge at the base of Svilengrad Peninsula, east of Lanchester Bay and west of Sabine Glacier on Davis Coast in Graham Land, Antarctica.

The peak is named after the town of Bankya in western Bulgaria.

Location
German-British mapping in 1996.

Map
 Trinity Peninsula. Scale 1:250000 topographic map No. 5697. Institut für Angewandte Geodäsie and British Antarctic Survey, 1996.

Notes

References
 Bulgarian Antarctic Gazetteer. Antarctic Place-names Commission. (details in Bulgarian, basic data in English)
 Bankya Peak. SCAR Composite Antarctic Gazetteer.

External links
 Bankya Peak. Copernix satellite image

Mountains of Graham Land
Bulgaria and the Antarctic
Davis Coast